Inger Nielsen is a former women's cricketer for the Denmark women's national cricket team who played nine ODIs. She made her debut against the Netherlands in 1997, and played four matches during the 1997 Women's Cricket World Cup. Her highest score in international cricket was seven not out, made against Ireland during the 1999 Women's European Cricket Championship, while he best bowling performance was against the Netherlands in 1998, when she took two wickets for 16 runs. In all, she scored 21 runs and took four wickets for Denmark. Her sister, Susanne Nielsen, also played international cricket for Denmark.

References

Danish women cricketers
Denmark women One Day International cricketers
Living people
Year of birth missing (living people)